"Mind Games" is the 28th single by Zard and released April 7, 1999 under B-Gram Records. The single debuted at #1 on the first week. It charted for six weeks and sold over 167,000 copies. This is the last time a Zard single would reach #1 first week in Oricon rankings.

Track list
All songs are written by Izumi Sakai.
Mind Games
composer: Masaaki Watanuki/arrangement: Hirohito Furui
the song was used in Fuji TV program Pro Yakyuu News as theme song
Hypnosis
composer: Hitoshi Okamoto/arrangement: Hitoshi Okamoto and Furui
Mind Games (Redway Secret Mix)
Mind Games (original karaoke)

References

1999 singles
Zard songs
Songs written by Izumi Sakai
Oricon Weekly number-one singles